Kenneth Stephen Daneyko (born April 17, 1964) is a Canadian former professional ice hockey defenceman who played his entire twenty-season career with the New Jersey Devils of the National Hockey League (NHL), winning three Stanley Cup championships with the team. He has been nicknamed "Mr. Devil" by Devils fans, as he currently holds both the franchise record for games played as a Devil with 1,283 games and in penalty minutes with 2,516. Daneyko now provides colour analysis alongside Bill Spaulding during broadcasts of Devils games on MSG Sportsnet.

Early years
Daneyko was born in Windsor, Ontario and grew up in Edmonton, Alberta, where he knew Mark Messier from a young age. He is of Ukrainian origin.

Playing career
Daneyko was drafted in the first round (18th overall) in the 1982 NHL Entry Draft, the second pick of the New Jersey Devils after the franchise relocated from Colorado; when he was drafted the organization had not yet chosen a new team name.  He spent several seasons in junior before getting drafted, and played for the Yorkton Terriers of the Saskatchewan Junior Hockey League, as well as the Great Falls Americans, Spokane Flyers and Seattle Breakers of the Western Hockey League.  He was called up to the Devils for the start of the 1983–84 season, but cracked his fibula during a game against the Hartford Whalers and missed over 40 games.  After his injury healed, he was assigned to the Kamloops Junior Oilers of the WHL for the remainder of the season.

Upon his arrival in the NHL, Daneyko established himself as a stay-at-home defenceman, and soon won fans over with his gritty and self-sacrificing play. Daneyko was also known for his missing front teeth, lost after he was hit in the mouth by a puck.  His gap-toothed smile was well known not only by Devils supporters, but by hockey fans around the world.  As a player who had spent all of his NHL career with New Jersey, Daneyko was nicknamed "Mr. Devil".  He is also referred to by the nickname "Dano".

Daneyko acquired over 2,500 penalty minutes in his career, finishing a season with over 200 penalty minutes five times.  Daneyko was never a high-scoring defenceman, and set a record by playing in 255 consecutive regular-season games without scoring a goal.  In his highest-scoring season, 1989–90, he scored six goals and 15 assists en route to a 21-point season.  In six seasons he scored no goals at all. He also has the lowest point per game average among all NHL players who played at least 1,000 games with 0.138. However, Daneyko's effectiveness was not measured by how many pucks he put in the net, but by how many pucks he kept out.  Daneyko was used primarily as a shadow defenceman, and often got physical in front of the net if a forward parked himself in the crease looking for a rebound.

In the late 1990s, Daneyko struggled with alcoholism while general manager Lou Lamoriello and Devils owner John McMullen stood by him and checked him into rehab. Daneyko recovered and played every game of New Jersey's successful 2000 playoffs, winning the Bill Masterton Trophy in 2000.

Along with Scott Stevens, he was part of a tough Devils defensive core that won the Stanley Cup three times, in 1994–95, 1999–2000 and 2002–03.  From the team's first playoff game while in New Jersey, in 1988, Daneyko played in every playoff game until game four of the 2003 quarterfinals. He also was scratched in the first six games of the 2003 finals, but, looking for a spark, coach Pat Burns inserted Daneyko into the lineup for game seven, replacing Oleg Tverdovsky. As a reward to his devotion of the team, and a hint of his impending retirement, Daneyko took the ice for the final shift of the Devils' game seven victory over the Mighty Ducks of Anaheim, which clinched their third Stanley Cup victory, in 2003.

Post-playing career

The Devils retired his uniform number, 3, on March 24, 2006. He was the second Devil to receive the honour after Scott Stevens had his No. 4 retired on February 3, 2006.

Daneyko currently provides his colour commentary on Devils' broadcasts on MSG Plus. Prior to this, he shared commentary and analysis between periods of Devils' broadcasts and was a regular starring analyst on MSG's "Hockey Night Live!" with host Al Trautwig and fellow commentators Ron Duguay, Dave Maloney, Mike Keenan, and Butch Goring, as well as "The Hockey Maven" Stan Fischler.

In October 2009, Daneyko began competing as a pairs figure skater on the Canadian Broadcasting Corporation reality show Battle of the Blades.

In 2010, Daneyko portrayed himself in the short film Ice Hockey, written and directed by Larry Cohen. The film also featured Randy Velischek.

In 2016, Daneyko was inducted into the Ukrainian Sports Hall of Fame.

Personal life
Daneyko was a resident of North Caldwell, New Jersey. He currently lives with his second wife Margaret. Daneyko was previously married to JonnaLyn Panico from 1992 to 2008. The couple had a daughter and a son, Taylor and Shane Daneyko.

Career statistics

Regular season and playoffs

International

See also
List of NHL players with 1,000 games played
List of NHL players with 2,000 career penalty minutes
List of NHL players who spent their entire career with one franchise

References

External links 

1964 births
Battle of the Blades participants
Bill Masterton Memorial Trophy winners
Canadian ice hockey defencemen
Canadian people of Ukrainian descent
Great Falls Americans players
Ice hockey people from Ontario
Kamloops Junior Oilers players
Living people
Maine Mariners players
National Hockey League first-round draft picks
National Hockey League players with retired numbers
New Jersey Devils draft picks
New Jersey Devils players
People from North Caldwell, New Jersey
Seattle Breakers players
Spokane Flyers players
Ice hockey people from Edmonton
Sportspeople from Windsor, Ontario
Stanley Cup champions
Yorkton Terriers players